Mehdi Khelaifia (born 13 March 1985 in Algeria) is an Algerian footballer. He formerly played as a defender for Atlantis FC in the Finnish Ykkönen.

Career
Khelaifia began his football career in the junior ranks of his hometown club of USM Annaba. During an international tournament with his club in France, he was spotted by Olympique Marseille scouts who quickly signed him to the academy. A regular member of the reserve side, he was not given a professional contract and he would eventually leave the club and sign with Atlantis FC in Finland.

International 
He has been capped for Algeria at the Under-23 level.

Personal
He is the nephew of former Algerian international Yacine Slatni.

External links
 Atlantis FC Profile

1985 births
Algerian footballers
Living people
Expatriate footballers in Finland
Atlantis FC players
USM Annaba players
Algerian expatriate footballers
Algerian expatriate sportspeople in Finland
Algeria under-23 international footballers
Algeria youth international footballers
Association football defenders
21st-century Algerian people